Kingsley School Bideford is a co-educational independent school in Bideford, Devon. The school was founded in 1884 as Edgehill College, and merged with Grenville College in 2009 to form Kingsley.

Alongside Shebbear College and West Buckland School, Kingsley is one of the three main independent schools in North Devon. It currently enrols 402 pupils.

History 

Kingsley was established in January 2009 as a merger of Edgehill College and Grenville College. The school's namesake is that of novelist Charles Kingsley, author of the locally-based adventure novel Westward Ho! (1855).

Edgehill College was founded in 1884 by the Bible Christian Church. Grenville College was founded in 1954 as an Anglican boys' school and in 1994 merged with Stella Maris, a Roman Catholic convent school, becoming co-educational.

On 28 October 2008, it was announced by Methodist Education that the schools would merge in a response to difficulty and pressure placed on maintaining independent education in North Devon. The move was triggered by a fall in pupil numbers at both schools since education reforms in 1997, and by difficult economic circumstances both locally and nationally.

In September 2019, the school was sold by the Methodist Independent Schools Trust (MIST) to KSI Education, a new educational company linked to Hong Kong-based China First Capital Group.

Kingsley currently divides its students into four houses, competing against one another in sport and academics: Putsborough, Croyde, Woolacombe and Saunton. Each house is named after a coastal resort along the local North Devon Coast AONB.

Headmasters
The current headmaster is Robert Pavis, having taken over from interim head Alastair Ramsay in February 2022.
2022–: Robert Pavis
2021–22: Alastair Ramsay (interim)
2020–21: Gill Jackson
2017–20: Pete Last
2013–17: Simon Woolcott
2009–13: Andy Waters

Facilities

Earth Centre 
In 2019, Kingsley broke ground on the Earth Centre, an umbrella term for Kingsley's unique commitment to climate action, biodiversity restoration and nutrition from healthy food. Kingsley, located in the UNESCO Biosphere of North Devon, aims to be carbon neutral by 2027.

The new developments will feature a 10,700 square-foot education centre, designed by JB Architects, and on-site ecology zones.

At the 2020 ISA Awards, Kingsley won Sustainability and Environmental Education School of the Year for its commitments to climate action.

SEND support 
The Grenville Dyslexic Centre was founded in 1969 and became one of the leading centres in the UK for maximising the achievements of dyslexic students.

The current Grenville Centre provides specialist support for Senior School students aged between 11 and 16, who have some form of learning difference or special educational needs and disabilities (SEND). The Edgehill Centre provides this service for students aged 6 to 11.

The Stella Maris Centre provides differentiated learning programmes for all students with mild to moderate learning differences, offering tailored support for each student according to need.

Kingsley Surf Academy 
Kingsley is located by the North Devon coast, less than 2 miles from Westward Ho! beach, and offers a leading programme for students of any experience who wish to excel in surfing. The academy offers both a practical and theoretical approach to better understand the sport of surfing.

Boarding 

There are currently three boarding houses available to Senior School pupils:
Belvoir House – for girls in years 7 to 10.
Carisbrooke – for boys in years 7 to 10.
Longfield – for all boarders in years 11 to 13.
Each house has a range of study-bedrooms, bathrooms, kitchen-cafes, a laundry and recreational spaces.

Incidents

2013 Kiltrasna House fire 
On 30 March 2013, there was a fire at Kiltrasna House, a derelict building on the edge of the school grounds, having previously been a girls' boarding house at Edgehill until September 2003. Devon and Somerset Fire and Rescue Service said the fire "severely damaged" around 70% of the building. There were no injuries.

References

Private schools in Devon
Methodist schools in England
Bideford
Buildings and structures in Bideford
2009 establishments in England
Educational institutions established in 2009